The Battle of Tarutino was a part of Napoleon's invasion of Russia. In the battle Russian troops under the command of Bennigsen defeated French troops under the command of Joachim Murat.

The battle is sometimes called the Battle of Vinkovo or the Battle of Chernishnya after the local river. Many historians claim that the latter name is more fitting because the village of Tarutino was 8 km from the described events.

Preceding events
After the battle of Borodino, Kutuzov realized that the Russian army would not survive one more large engagement and ordered his soldiers to retreat to the south of Moscow to reinforce his army. At first it retreated in the south-east direction along the Ryazan road. When the army reached the Moskva River it crossed it and turned to the west to the Old Kaluga road. The army pitched camp in a village of Tarutino near Kaluga. At the same time small units of Cossacks continued moving along the Ryazan road misleading French troops under the command of Murat.  When he discovered his error he did not retreat but made camp not far from Tarutino in order to keep his eye on the Russian camp, while Napoleon occupied Moscow.

Battle
On 18 October 1812 Kutuzov ordered Bennigsen and Miloradovich to attack Murat's corps (20,000 men) with two columns stealthily crossing the forest in the dead of night. Bennigsen's main column included three columns led by Vasily Orlov-Denisov, Karl Gustav von Baggehufwudt and Alexander Osterman-Tolstoy respectively. The other column was supposed to play an auxiliary role. In the darkness most of the troops got lost. By the morning only Cossack troops under the command of General Vasily Orlov-Denisov reached the original destination, suddenly attacked the French troops and captured the French camp with transports and cannons. Since other Russian units came late the French were able to recover. When the Russians emerged from the forest they came under French fire and suffered casualties. Murat was forced to retreat to escape being surrounded. The French forces suffered more than 3,000 dead and wounded, 12 cannons, 20 caissons, 30 train-waggons had been taken, two generals killed, the Russians lost about 500 dead.

Aftermath
Kutuzov had attacked Napoleon's army and won a victory. One day later Napoleon started his own retreat from Moscow on the 19 October 1812 southwards in direction of Kaluga.
The next major battle was the Battle of Maloyaroslavets.

In popular culture
The battle is depicted in Leo Tolstoy's War and Peace. In the novel, Tolstoy claims that while the battle did not achieve any of its goals, it was exactly what the Russian army needed at the time, in that it exposed the weakness of the French army and gave Napoleon the push needed to begin his retreat.

See also
List of battles of the French invasion of Russia

Notes

References

Sources
 Bourgogne, Adrien Jean Baptiste François, Memoirs of Sergeant Bourgogne, 1812-1813 Bourgogne, Adrien Jean Baptiste François, Memoirs of Sergeant Bourgogne, 1812-1813 access-date=7 March 2021
 Chandler, David, The Campaigns of Napoleon New York, Macmillan, 1966 Chandler, David G., The Campaigns of Napoleon Access-date=7 March 2021
 Weider, Ben and Franceschi, Michel, The Wars Against Napoleon: Debunking the Myth of the Napoleonic Wars, 2007 Weider, Ben and Franceschi, The Wars Against Napoleon: Debunking the Myth of the Napoleonic Wars access-date=7 March 2021
 Zamoyski, Adam, Moscow 1812: Napoleon's Fatal March, 1980 Zamoyski, Adam, Moscow 1812, Napoleon's Fatal March access-date=7 March 2021

External links
 

Battles of the French invasion of Russia
Battles of the Napoleonic Wars
Battles involving France
Battles involving Russia
Conflicts in 1812
October 1812 events
1812 in the Russian Empire
Kaluga Oblast
Joachim Murat